Eucalyptus retusa, commonly known as the Point Hood yate, is a species of mallee that is endemic to a restricted area in Western Australia. It has smooth, greyish bark, glossy green, egg-shaped to spatula-shaped adult leaves, flower buds in clusters of between thirteen and nineteen, yellowish green flowers and fruit with their bases fused together.

Description
It has smooth, pale grey bark that is cream-coloured when new. The flower buds are arranged in leaf axils in clusters of between thirteen and nineteen, the buds joined at the base.

Taxonomy and naming
Eucalyptus retusa was first formally described in 2008 by Dean Nicolle, Malcolm French and Nathan McQuoid from a specimen collected near Bremer Bay in 2004. The description was published in the journal Nuytsia. The specific epithet (retusa) is from the Latin retusus meaning blunted, rounded, notched at the tip.

Distribution and habitat
The Point Hood yate is only known from a single population at the type location near Bremer Bay where it grows in low scrubland on a rocky headland.

Conservation status
This eucalypt is classified as "Priority One" by the Government of Western Australia Department of Parks and Wildlife, meaning that it is known from only one or a few locations which are potentially at risk.

See also
List of Eucalyptus species

References

retusa
Endemic flora of Western Australia
Myrtales of Australia
Eucalypts of Western Australia
Plants described in 2008